Arab al-Safa, was a Palestinian Arab village in the District of Baysan . It was depopulated during the 1948 Arab-Israeli War. It was located 7.5 km south of Baysan.

The village was destroyed on May 20, 1948, by the Israeli Golani Brigade under Operation Gideon.

History

British Mandate era
In  the 1922 census of Palestine, conducted by the  Mandatory Palestine authorities,  Saffa had a population of 255 Muslims, increasing in the  1931 census   to 540; 4 Christians and the rest  Muslims, in 108  houses.

In the 1945 statistics, the population consisted of  650 Muslims, and the total land area was  12,518 dunams, according to an official land and population survey. The land ownership in the village (in dunams) was as follows:

By 1945, the Arab population were occupied mainly in cereal farming. The use of village land in that year:

The population  had grown to 754 by 1948 with 150 houses.

1948 and aftermath
The village became depopulated on 20 May 1948, a week after the fall of Baysan Following the war the area was incorporated into the State of Israel, with the village's land left undeveloped; the closest villages are the kibbutzim of Tirat Zvi (established 1937) to the south-west and Sde Eliyahu (established 1939) to the west.

In 1992 the village site was described: "Three palm trees stand on the village site. The surrounding lands are used for growing wheat."

References

Bibliography

External links
Welcome To 'Arab al-Safa
 'Arab al-Safa, Zochrot
Survey of Western Palestine Map 9:    IAA, Wikimedia commons
'Arab al-Safa from Khalil Sakakini Cultural Centre

Arab villages depopulated during the 1948 Arab–Israeli War